Italy competed at the 1982 European Athletics Indoor Championships in Milan, Italy, from 6 to 7 March 1982.

Medalists

Top eight
18 Italian athletes reached the top eight in this edition of the championships.
Men

Women

See also
 Italy national athletics team

References

External links
 EAA official site 

1982
1982 European Athletics Indoor Championships
1982 in Italian sport